Marianela Lacayo Mendoza (b. 20 March 1981) is a Nicaraguan model and entrepreneur. She was the winner of Miss Nicaragua 2002 and Miss World Latin International 2002 beauty pageants.

Lacayo was born in Managua. She holds a degree in business administration from UNICIT and MBA from the American University of Nicaragua and Technological Institute of Monterray, Master in Image consulting from the Color Me Beautiful school in London and a diploma in Leadership and Electoral Strategies for Political Women from Latin University of Panama.

Currently, she works in the fashion sector as an image consultant and in journalism as a columnist for magazines Mía, De Boda Novias, and Nicaragua and the newspaper La Prensa. Previously, she collaborated with Fashion & Life and Scaparate, both magazines.

Biography
When Lacayo was 14, she almost drowned attempting to rescue a friend at a pool before being saved herself.

In September 2009, Lacayo wed Fernando Cuenco, from Spain. On 14 February 2017, Lacayo announced that she was pregnant with her son. He was named Fernando.

Citations

1981 births
Living people
Miss Nicaragua winners
Miss Universe 2002 contestants
Nicaraguan female models
Miss International 2002 delegates